The International Federation of Saddlers' Unions was a global union federation uniting trade unions representing workers involved in making saddles and related products.

The federation was founded in 1906, on the initiative of the General German Saddlers' Union.  Johannes Sassenbach, former president of the German union, was appointed as its president.  In 1921, it merged into the International Union of Boot and Shoe Operatives, Leather, Skin and Hide Workers, which renamed itself as the "International Federation of Boot and Shoe Operatives and Leather Workers".

References

Leather industry trade unions
Trade unions established in 1906
Trade unions disestablished in 1921